Mary Grant Carmichael (185117 March 1935) was an English composer. She was born in Birkenhead near Liverpool, and may have been of Irish parentage. She was educated in France and Switzerland later studied music in Munich. After completing her education, she worked as a pianist and accompanist and died in London.

Works
Carmichael was known as a composer of songs and piano pieces. Selected works include:
Cradle song (in Four songs) (Text: William Blake)
Infant Joy (Text: William Blake)
Introduction to the Songs of Innocence (Text: William Blake)
It is the hour (Text: George Gordon Noel Byron, Lord Byron)
Merrily flute and loudly (in Three Lyrics (first set) from Heine's Book of Songs) (Text: after Heinrich Heine)
 Mona spinning (Text: Alice Cary), published in The Girl's Own Paper (1886)
My faint spirit, op. 12 (Text: Percy Bysshe Shelley)
So loved and so loving, op. 8 no. 1 (in Three Lyrics (second set) from Heine's Book of Songs) (Text: after Heinrich Heine)
Sweetheart, sigh no more (Text: Thomas Bailey Aldrich)
The blossom (in Four songs) (Text: William Blake)

References

1851 births
1935 deaths
19th-century classical composers
20th-century classical composers
Accompanists
English classical pianists
English women pianists
English classical composers
British women classical composers
20th-century English composers
20th-century English women musicians
19th-century British composers
20th-century women composers
19th-century women composers
19th-century English women
19th-century English people
19th-century women pianists
20th-century women pianists